Citharacanthus livingstoni is a species of New World tarantula (family Theraphosidae).  It is native to eastern Guatemala. There are no recognized subspecies.

References 

 

Theraphosidae
Endemic fauna of Guatemala
Spiders described in 1996
Spiders of Central America